Kevin Fant (born October 24, 1980) is a former American football quarterback. He was the starting quarterback for the Mississippi State Bulldogs in 2001, 2002, and 2003.

Fant was controversially suspended by the NCAA for the 2002 season opener against Oregon after a family friend and Mississippi State temporarily paid for new tires for Fant until Fant's mother paid him back later that day. In the school's entire records of athletic feats, Fant's 5,631 passing yards and 33 passing touchdowns rank third and fifth, respectively.He now the coaches at Vancleave High school in Mississippi.

References

1980 births
Living people
American football quarterbacks
People from Pascagoula, Mississippi
Mississippi State Bulldogs football players